Xavier Areny Fite (born 8 May 1957) is an Andorran alpine skier. He competed in three events at the 1976 Winter Olympics.

References

External links
 

1957 births
Living people
Andorran male alpine skiers
Olympic alpine skiers of Andorra
Alpine skiers at the 1976 Winter Olympics
Place of birth missing (living people)